The 2015 Durango-Durango Emakumeen Saria was the fourteenth running of the Durango-Durango Emakumeen Saria, a women's bicycle race in Spain. It was rated by the Union Cycliste Internationale (UCI) as a 1.2 category race, and was won by Sweden's Emma Johansson.

Results

References

External links
 Official website 

2015 in Spanish road cycling
Durango-Durango Emakumeen Saria
2015 in women's road cycling
June 2015 sports events in Europe